Institute of Mathematics and Applications may refer to:

Institute for Mathematics and its Applications, Minneapolis, US
Institute of Mathematics and Applications, Bhubaneswar, India
Institute of Mathematics and its Applications, London, UK

See also
 Institute of Mathematics (disambiguation)